() is a Greek term for a president or chairman.

In the Byzantine Empire, the term appeared in a technical use during the 12th century.

In addition, from the 12th century on, and particularly during the 13th and 14th centuries, the term was used for the governors of individual towns.

See also
 Praeses
 Primicerius
 Proedros

References

Sources

Byzantine administrative offices